Antique's at-large congressional district, also known as Antique's lone district, is the sole congressional district of the Philippines in the province of Antique. Antique has been represented in the country's various national legislatures since 1898. Since 1907, Antique has been entitled to one member in the House of Representatives of the Philippines, elected provincewide at-large, except for a brief period between 1943 and 1944 when a second seat was allocated in the National Assembly of the Second Philippine Republic. It was also earlier represented by three members in the First Philippine Republic legislature known as the Malolos Congress from 1898 to 1901.

The district is currently represented by Antonio Agapito "AA" Legarda Jr. of the Nationalist People's Coalition (NPC).

Representation history

Election results

2022

2019

2016

2013

2010

References

Congressional districts of the Philippines
Politics of Antique (province)
1898 establishments in the Philippines
1907 establishments in the Philippines
At-large congressional districts of the Philippines
Congressional districts of Western Visayas
Constituencies established in 1898